Cumberland Avenue is a TECO Line station located in Tampa, Florida.  It is located at Cumberland Avenue and Channelside Drive.

See also

Light rail in the United States
List of streetcar systems in the United States
Streetcars in North America
Transportation in Florida

References

Railway stations in the United States opened in 2002
TECO Line Streetcar System stations
2002 establishments in Florida